Amahai is a village on the south coast of the Indonesian island of Seram, to the south of Masohi. Daily speedboats connect Tulehu (Ambon) with Amahai, Seram's main port.

References

Populated places in Seram Island